The 2015–16 Boston College Eagles men's basketball team represented Boston College during the 2015–16 NCAA Division I men's basketball season. The Eagles, led by second year head coach Jim Christian, played their home games at Conte Forum and were members of the Atlantic Coast Conference. The Eagles finished the season with a record of 7–25, 0–18 to finish in last place in ACC play. This was the first time a team went winless in the ACC during a season. They lost to Florida State in the first round of the ACC tournament.

Previous season
The Eagles finished the 2014–15 season with a record of 13–19, 4–14 in ACC play to finish in 13th place. They advanced to the second round of the ACC tournament where they lost to North Carolina.

Departures

Incoming Transfers

Recruiting

Recruiting Class of 2016

Roster

Schedule and results 

|-
!colspan=9 style="background:#; color:white;"| Exhibition

|-
!colspan=9 style="background:#; color:white;"| Non-conference regular season

|-
!colspan=9 style="background:#; color:#FFFFFF;"|ACC regular season

|-
!colspan=9 style="background:#; color:#FFFFFF;"|ACC tournament

See also
2015–16 Boston College Eagles women's basketball team

Boston College Eagles men's basketball seasons
Boston College
Boston College Eagles men's basketball
Boston College Eagles men's basketball
Boston College Eagles men's basketball
Boston College Eagles men's basketball